The men's keirin competition at the 2002 Asian Games was held on 4 and 5 October at the Geumjeong Velodrome.

Schedule
All times are Korea Standard Time (UTC+09:00)

Results
Legend
DNF — Did not finish
DNS — Did not start
DSQ — Disqualified

Qualification

Heat 1

Heat 2

Heat 3

Repechage

Semifinals

Heat 1

Heat 2

Finals

Final (7~12)

Final (1~6)

Final standing

References

External links 
Qualification Results
Final Results

Track Men Keirin